Karimabad may refer to:

Iran

Alborz Province
 Karimabad, Alborz, a village in Nazarabad County, Alborz Province, Iran

Chaharmahal and Bakhtiari Province
 Karimabad, Ardal, a village in Ardal County
 Karimabad, Kuhrang, a village in Kuhrang County

East Azerbaijan Province
 Karimabad, Charuymaq, a village in Charuymaq County
 Karimabad, Meyaneh, a village in Meyaneh County
 Karim Abad, Meyaneh, a village in Meyaneh County
 Karimabad, Kolah Boz-e Sharqi, a village in Meyaneh County

Fars Province
Karimabad, Hashivar, a village in Darab County
Karimabad, Paskhan, a village in Darab County
Karimabad, Fasa, a village in Fasa County
Karimabad, Mohr, a village in Mohr County
Karimabad-e Jadval-e Now, a village in Shiraz County

Golestan Province
Karimabad, Galikash, a village in Galikash County
Karimabad, Gorgan, a village in Gorgan County
Karimabad, Kordkuy, a village in Kordkuy County

Hamadan Province
 Karimabad, Bahar, a village in Bahar County
 Karimabad, Malayer, a village in Malayer County
 Karimabad, Tuyserkan, a village in Tuyserkan County

Hormozgan Province
 Karimabad, Hormozgan, a village in Rudan County

Isfahan Province
 Karimabad, Ardestan, a village in Ardestan County
 Karimabad, Isfahan, a village in Isfahan County

Kerman Province
 Karimabad-e Sofla, a village in Anbarabad County
 Karimabad-e Olya, Anbarabad, a village in Anbarabad County
 Karimabad-e Ansari, a village in Fahraj County
 Karimabad-e Tabasi, a village in Fahraj County
 Karimabad-e Sargorich, a village in Faryab County
 Karimabad, Kerman, a village in Kerman County
 Karimabad-e Abnil, a village in Kerman County
 Karimabad-e Gavkhaneh, a village in Kerman County
 Karimabad-e Hajj Ali, a village in Kerman County
 Karimabad-e Robat, a village in Kerman County
 Karimabad-e Sardar, a village in Kerman County
 Karimabad-e Olya, Rafsanjan, a village in Rafsanjan County
 Karimabad, Ravar, a village in Ravar County
 Karimabad, Rigan, a village in Rigan County
 Karimabad-e Posht-e Dig, a village in Rigan County
 Karimabad, Rudbar-e Jonubi, a village in Rudbar-e Jonubi County
 Karimabad, Sirjan, a village in Sirjan County
 Karimabad, Chahar Gonbad, a village in Sirjan County
 Karimabad, Zarand, a village in Zarand County

Kermanshah Province
Karimabad, Kangavar, a village in Kangavar County
Karimabad, Ravansar, a village in Ravansar County
Karimabad, Sahneh, a village in Sahneh County

Khuzestan Province
 Karimabad, Andika, a village in Andika County
 Karimabad, Behbahan, a village in Behbahan County
 Karimabad, Hendijan, a village in Hendijan County
 Karimabad, Lali, a village in Lali County
 Karimabad, Masjed Soleyman, a village in Masjed Soleyman County
 Karimabad, Ramshir, a village in Ramshir County

Kohgiluyeh and Boyer-Ahmad Province
Karimabad, Kohgiluyeh and Boyer-Ahmad, a village in Boyer-Ahmad County

Kurdistan Province
 Karimabad, Baneh, a village in Baneh County
 Karimabad, Qorveh, a village in Qorveh County
 Karimabad, Serishabad, a village in Qorveh County
 Karimabad, Saqqez, a village in Saqqez County
 Karimabad-e Ayaghchi, a village in Saqqez County

Lorestan Province
 Karimabad (33°53′ N 47°56′ E), Delfan, a village in Delfan County
 Karimabad (33°55′ N 47°46′ E), Delfan, a village in Delfan County
 Karimabad Nurali, a village in Delfan County
 Karimabad Qadim, a village in Delfan County
 Karimabad, Khorramabad, a village in Khorramabad County
 Karimabad, Doab, a village in Selseleh County
Karimabad, Yusefvand, a village in Selseleh County

Markazi Province
Karimabad, Markazi, a village in Zarandieh County, Markazi Province, Iran

Mazandaran Province
Karimabad, Chalus, a village in Chalus County
Karimabad, Kelardasht, a village in Chalus County

North Khorasan Province
Karimabad-e Olya, North Khorasan, a village in Esfarayen County
Karimabad-e Sofla, North Khorasan, a village in Esfarayen County

Qom Province
Karimabad, Qom, a village in Qom Province, Iran

Razavi Khorasan Province
Karimabad, Jowayin, a village in Jowayin County
Karimabad, Kalat, a village in Kalat County
Karimabad, Kardeh, a village in Mashhad County
Karimabad, Kenevist, a village in Mashhad County
Karimabad, Nishapur, a village in Nishapur County
Karimabad, Zeberkhan, a village in Nishapur County
Karimabad-e Suis, a village in Nishapur County
Karimabad, Rashtkhvar, a village in Rashtkhvar County

Sistan and Baluchestan Province
Karimabad, Chabahar, a village in Chabahar County
Karimabad, Iranshahr, a village in Iranshahr County
Karimabad, alternate name of Kur-e Kelkian, a village in Iranshahr County
Karimabad, Eskelabad, a village in Khash County
Karimabad, Gowhar Kuh, a village in Khash County
Karimabad-e Hajji Karim, a village in Khash County
Karimabad-e Kheybar, a village in Khash County
Karimabad-e Seyyed Ali Khamenehi, a village in Khash County
Karimabad, Qasr-e Qand, a village in Qasr-e Qand County

South Khorasan Province
Karimabad, Jolgeh-e Mazhan, a village in Khusf County
Karimabad, Qaleh Zari, a village in Khusf County
Karimabad, Sarbisheh, a village in Sarbisheh County
Karimabad, Dastgerdan, a village in Tabas County
Karimabad, Kuh Yakhab, a village in Tabas County

Tehran Province
Karimabad, Tehran, a village in Tehran County
Karimabad, Pakdasht, a village in Pakdasht County
Karimabad-e Muqufeh, a village in Rey County
Karimabad-e Tehranchi, a village in Rey County
Karimabad Rural District

West Azerbaijan Province
Karimabad, Poldasht, a village in Poldasht County
Karimabad, Takab, a village in Takab County
Karimabad, Nazlu, a village in Urmia County
Karimabad, Silvaneh, a village in Urmia County

Yazd Province
Karimabad, Behabad, a village in Behabad County
Karimabad, Mehriz, a village in Mehriz County

Pakistan
 Karimabad, Gilgit-Baltistan, the main town of Hunza in Gilgit-Baltistan region
 Karimabad, Karachi, a neighborhood of Karachi, Sindh province
 Karimabad, Chitral, a Union Council in Chitral District, Khyber Pakhtunkhwa province

India
 Karimabad, Pulwama, a village in Pulwama district, Jammu and Kashmir

See also
 Karimabad-e Olya (disambiguation)
 Karamabad (disambiguation)